What Mad Universe is a science fiction novel, written in 1949 by the American author Fredric Brown.

Synopsis
Keith Winton is an editor for a science fiction magazine, working during the late 40s when genre fiction magazines have not yet given over to TV shows. With his glamorous co-worker, Betty (an employee of the 'Romantic Stories' magazine, on whom he has an undeclared crush), he visits his boss in his elegant estate in the Catskills, unfortunately on the same day as an experimental rocket laden with a high-voltage generator able to be seen discharging on the Moon's surface is to be launched. Betty has to go back to New York. Keith is alone in his friends' garden, deep in thought, when, suddenly, the rocket's generator (whose launch has been a failure) crashes on his friends' residence and dissipates its gigawatt electrical charge right on the spot Keith is standing on. The massive energy discharge allows his physical form to 'shift' through dimensions, taking him to a strange but deceptively similar parallel universe.

At a superficial glance, the streets look the same, there are the same kind of cars and the people wear the same kind of clothes (and he also knows some of the people, though sometimes they don't know him), and the radio broadcasts familiar tunes from the Benny Goodman Orchestra. But there are many incongruous elements in this seemingly familiar reality. Wild-eyed, Keith is astonished to see how credits have replaced dollars; is amazed when he encounters some scantily-clad pin-up girls who are, at the same time, astronauts; is driven to stupor when he encounters his first lunar native vacationing on Earth. He inadvertently discovers, to his cost, that such an innocent activity as coin collecting could lead to being suspected of being an Arcturian spyand since Arcturians possess awesome mental powers and are bent on exterminating humanity, any such suspicion is liable to lead to being shot on the spot. Managing to escape the spy scare, he finds that New York has no night life; there is a total, impenetrable darkness, and wandering the completely dark Times Square could lead to a fatal encounter with the terrible Nighters. Trying to find his feet in this bewildering world, Winton discovers thatthough interstellar space flight and war with aliens has become a daily realityScience Fiction is still being written and read. He reasons that his best way of making a living would be as a Science Fiction writer. But this turns out to be yet another blunder, placing him under grave suspicion by the formidable WBI (World Bureau of Investigation) and another narrow brush with being summarily shot as a spy.

As a science fiction editor, Keith rather despised space opera, but now finds himself living in a "Mad Universe" where the most typical aspects of that subgenre are an actual, daily reality. At first inclined to regard all this as a bit far-fetched, he is reprimanded by this world's version of his beloved Betty: "Do you think the danger of all humanity being exterminated is a matter for joke?" In order to have any hope of getting  back to his own world, he has to get in touch with the impossibly 'larger than life' hero who leads Humanity's struggle against the Arcturian menace, helped by an "artificial brain" sidekick Mekky. To do that, Winton must again descend into the very dangerous streets of nighttime New York. He makes contact with the underworldwhich includes both submachine-gun toting gangsters and Proximans who can burn you to cinder by simply focusing their red lens of an eyeestablishes a partnership with a desperate criminal, steals the private spaceship of a rich United States Senator, learns space navigation in a single night and narrowly avoids being blasted by a naval ship for having entered a restricted sector of space, before finally getting involved in a desperate last-minute plan to thwart the onslaught of a fearsome alien superweapon against the Solar System and Earth. In the end, Winton has no choice but himself assume the role of a dashing space hero, embarking on an almost suicidal single-handed attack on the terrible alien ship.
He might die the next minute - or he just might get blasted back to his own world. But does he truly want to go back to his humdrum life in that commonsense world? Could he get to a world which is just a bit better?

Style
What Mad Universe is full of humor, mostly stemming from the description of the culture shock that the protagonist feels, and the strange things that are in the universe, like sewing machines that open the way for a voyage in space. In this timeline, H. G. Wells did not write a fictional account of a Martian invasion of Earth but a factual political treatise strongly condemning the human invasion and colonization of Mars. A half-serious, half-humorous take on modern society and the reality of our world, its light-hearted tone would be built on by subsequent books, most notably his 1955 work, Martians, Go Home.

The idea of humanity facing an implacably hostile alien species bent on its destruction, with whom no negotiation or compromise is possible, is shared with Brown's earlier short story "Arena".

Reception
Boucher and McComas named What Mad Universe the best SF novel of 1949, citing its "blend of humor, logic, terror and satire". P. Schuyler Miller praised the novel as a "gleeful mulligan stew of well tried ingredients dished up with that all-important difference in flavor." C. Ben Ostrander reviewed the 1978 reprint of What Mad Universe in The Space Gamer No. 18. Ostrander commented that "Brown tells us something about ourselves as science fiction readers with this novel. The message is as true today as it was in 1949 when it was first published."

Ward Smythe noted that "Cervantes sought to write a satire on the Chivalric romances, a very common literary genre in his time. He ended up creating Don Quixote, one of the finest of the fictional Knights Errant (the best of them, in the view of many). Frederic Brown's satire of Space Opera is a satire, all right – but still, it is also among the finest examples of Space Opera…"

References

Sources

External links
Sci Fi Weekly's Classic Book Review
SF review

1949 science fiction novels
American science fiction novels
Fiction set around Arcturus
E. P. Dutton books
Novels by Fredric Brown
Novels about parallel universes